Joseph Desmedt (born 30 April 1912, died 1944) was a Belgian footballer. He played in four matches for the Belgium national football team in 1933.

References

External links
 

1912 births
1944 deaths
Belgian footballers
Belgium international footballers
People from Uccle
Association football forwards
Royale Union Saint-Gilloise players